Margaret Dawn Paice ( Cantle, born 1 September 1920) is an Australian children's writer, commercial artist and book illustrator.

Early life and education 
Margaret Dawn Cantle was born in Brisbane, Australia on 1 September 1920, daughter of Violet (née Burman) and Sydney Cantle. Paice was raised in rural Queensland and was educated locally and through correspondence schooling, before attending Moreton Bay High School.

Career 
She had several poems published in The Central Queensland Herald in 1937. In 1942 she married Hubert Whitfield Paice. He died in 1955 and Paice moved to Sydney, where she studied at the National Art School and the Royal Art Society, gaining employment as a commercial artist.

She wrote and illustrated her first book, Mirram, in 1955. It was commended in the picture book category of the 1955 Children's Book Council of Australia Book of the Year awards. She provided illustrations for her own and other books published by Angus & Robertson, including three books by Ann E. Wells.

Colour in the Creek was a ten-episode television series adapted from Paice's novel of the same name and Shadow of Wings. It was shown on TCN 9.

In 1960 she married Wilfred Harriss, who died in 1975. She has lived in the Blue Mountains since 1969.

In 1978 she was interviewed by Hazel de Berg for the National Library of Australia's oral history collection. Her papers, including letters and original artwork, are held by the State Library of New South Wales.

Selected works

Author and illustrator

Fiction

Trilogy: Colour in the creek

Nonfiction

Illustrator

References

External links 
Photograph of Margaret Paice, taken by Hazel de Berg for the National Library of Australia on 1 March 1978

1920 births
Possibly living people
Australian children's writers
20th-century Australian women writers
Australian women illustrators